Pipunculus violovitshi is a species of fly in the family Pipunculidae.

Distribution
Russia, Great Britain.

References

Pipunculidae
Insects described in 1991
Diptera of Europe